Aamland or Åmland is a Norwegian surname. Notable people with the surname include:

Tolv Aamland (1893–1983), Norwegian politician
Torkil Åmland (born 1966), Norwegian politician
David Amland (1931–2010), American painter and art educator

Norwegian-language surnames